Saint Amelia (Amalberga, Amelberga) may refer to:

 Amalberga of Maubeuge, 7th-century Frankish nun and saint (July 10)
 Amalberga of Temse, 8th-century Lotharingian noblewoman and saint (July 10 or October 27)
 Amelberga of Susteren, 9th-century Dutch nun and saint (November 21)

See also
 Amalaberga, queen of the Thuringii